Samuel Gueulette (born 19 May 2000) is a Rwandan professional footballer who plays as a midfielder for Roeselare and the Rwanda national team.

Professional career
Gueulette began his senior career with the Belgian club Tubize, before transferring to Roeselare on 27 July 2020.

International career
Gueulette was born in Rwanda to a Belgian father and Rwandan mother, and moved to Belgium at a young age. He represented the Rwanda U20 for a pair of 2019 Africa U-20 Cup of Nations qualification matches in 2018.  He was also called up for the Rwanda U23s for a 2019 Africa U-23 Cup of Nations qualification match in 2018. He debuted for the senior Rwanda national team in a 2–0 friendly win over the Central African Republic on 3 June 2021.

References

External links
 

2000 births
Living people
Rwandan footballers
Rwanda international footballers
Belgian footballers
Rwandan people of Belgian descent
Belgian people of Rwandan descent
A.F.C. Tubize players
K.S.V. Roeselare players
Association football midfielders